Sympistis corusca is a species of moth in the family Noctuidae (the owlet moths).

The MONA or Hodges number for Sympistis corusca is 10074.

References

Further reading

 
 
 

corusca
Articles created by Qbugbot
Moths described in 1899